Amanda Kate Pritchard (born May 1976) is a British healthcare official and public policy analyst who has been the Chief Executive of NHS England since 1 August 2021. Pritchard previously served as chief operating officer of NHS England and as chief executive of NHS Improvement from 2019 to 2021.

She was formerly chief executive of Guy's and St Thomas' NHS Foundation Trust from January 2016 to July 2019, having been acting chief executive from October 2015 to January 2016.

Early and personal life
Pritchard was born in Somerset, the daughter of John Pritchard, later a Church of England bishop. She grew up in County Durham, attending Durham Johnston Comprehensive School. She graduated from St Anne's College at the University of Oxford with a degree in modern history. Whilst a student, she served as the Librarian of The Oxford Union.

Pritchard is married with three children.

Career
Pritchard joined the NHS Management Training Scheme in 1997 and has worked for the NHS for her entire career.

In 2002, she became a manager at Chelsea and Westminster Hospital NHS Foundation Trust. From 2005 to 2006, Pritchard served as the health team leader of the Prime Minister's Delivery Unit under Tony Blair, before returning to Chelsea and Westminster Hospital NHS Foundation Trust in 2006 as deputy chief executive, aged 29. Six years later she moved to Guy's and St Thomas' NHS Foundation Trust as chief operating officer and was appointed as its first-ever female chief executive in 2015.

On 5 June 2019, Pritchard moved to NHS England and NHS Improvement as COO of NHS England and CEO of NHS Improvement. Effectively the deputy CEO of the NHS, she led it operationally through COVID-19, the vaccine rollout, and its recovery, including service transformation, digitisation, and patient care improvements.

Long seen as the frontrunner to replace Simon Stevens as CEO of the NHS, it was announced on 28 July 2021 that Pritchard would be appointed as the next chief executive of NHS England; she took up the post on 1 August 2021 as the first woman in the role. On 3 August 2021 she was replaced as CEO of NHS Improvement by Stephen Powis on an interim basis.

On 14 December 2021 she joined the Prime Minister and Health Secretary in calling for volunteers to come forward to help with the COVID vaccine booster campaign.

References

1976 births
Living people
Administrators in the National Health Service
British women chief executives
Alumni of the University of Oxford
National Health Service (England)